Dometa Point (‘Nos Dometa’ \'nos do-'me-ta\) is a point in the middle part of South Beaches on Byers Peninsula, Livingston Island in the South Shetland Islands, Antarctica. It is situated 4.3 km west-northwest of Rish Point, 1.2 km southwest of Negro Hill, 4.6 km southeast of Chester Cone, and 4.2 km east-northeast of Nikopol Point. Fontus Lake is centred 600 m northeast of the point.

The feature is named after Dometa, governor of the southwestern Bulgarian province of Kutmichevitsa hosting the mission of St. Kliment Ohridski assigned by Czar Boris I of Bulgaria (9th Century AD).

Location

Map
 Península Byers, Isla Livingston. Mapa topográfico a escala 1:25000. Madrid: Servicio Geográfico del Ejército, 1992.
 L.L. Ivanov et al. Antarctica: Livingston Island and Greenwich Island, South Shetland Islands. Scale 1:100000 topographic map. Sofia: Antarctic Place-names Commission of Bulgaria, 2005.
 L.L. Ivanov. Antarctica: Livingston Island and Greenwich, Robert, Snow and Smith Islands. Scale 1:120000 topographic map. Troyan: Manfred Wörner Foundation, 2010.  (First edition 2009. )
 Antarctic Digital Database (ADD). Scale 1:250000 topographic map of Antarctica. Scientific Committee on Antarctic Research (SCAR). Since 1993, regularly upgraded and updated.
 L.L. Ivanov. Antarctica: Livingston Island and Smith Island. Scale 1:100000 topographic map. Manfred Wörner Foundation, 2017.

References
 Dometa Point. SCAR Composite Gazetteer of Antarctica.
 Bulgarian Antarctic Gazetteer. Antarctic Place-names Commission. (details in Bulgarian, basic data in English)

External links
 Dometa Point. Copernix satellite image

Headlands of Livingston Island
Bulgaria and the Antarctic